Lesna may refer to the following places:

Lešná, a village in eastern Czech Republic, Zlín Region, Moravia
Leśna, a town in Lower Silesian Voivodeship (south-west Poland)
Leśna, Kłodzko County in Lower Silesian Voivodeship (south-west Poland)
Leśna, Opole Voivodeship (south-west Poland)
Leśna, Podlaskie Voivodeship (north-east Poland)
Leśna, Żywiec County in Silesian Voivodeship (south Poland)
Leśna, Świętokrzyskie Voivodeship (south-central Poland)
Lesná (disambiguation), several villages in the Czech Republic and Slovakia